Parsifal III is a 54-metre (177 feet) sailing yacht built in 2005 by Perini Navi currently owned by Danish entrepreneur Kim Vibe-Petersen. Parsifall III became popular through Bravo's television show Below Deck Sailing Yacht.

The yacht was last refitted in 2012 with its interior designed by Remi Tessier and its exterior styled by Perini Navi.

In 2006, Parsifal III won the World Superyacht Awards Sailing Yacht of the Year Award as well as the Best Interior Design - Sail Yacht. It also won Sailing Yacht Interior at the Showboats Awards in 2006.

Accommodation 
Parsifall III can accommodate up to 12 guests in five rooms, including a master suite, two double cabins, two twin cabins and two pullman beds. It can carry up to 9 crew members on board.

References 

Sailing yachts of the United Kingdom